Pierre Bruno Hugo Fontana, otherwise known as Hugo del Carril (30 November 1912 – 13 August 1989 in Buenos Aires), was an Argentine film actor, film director and tango singer of the classic era.

Early life

Born in Buenos Aires, del Carril was the son of parents of a rich economic position, his mother Orsolina Bertani was born in Argentina (daughter of the Italian Anarchist Orsini Bertani), but his father Hugo Fontana was an Italian architect, born in Milan. But in spite of the comforts and the comfortable life they led, his parents separated and young Hugo was left in the charge of a family friend.

Career
Del Carril originally began as a popular personality on Argentine radio, and parlayed that into a film career that began in late 1936. He was an immediate hit, and developed into one of Argentina's major film stars. He made some 50 film appearances as an actor between then and his retirement in 1976 but he turned to directing in 1949 and simultaneously directed, acted and produced many of his films becoming one of the industries highest earners of the period. In 1952 he directed the widely acclaimed Argentine film, Las Aguas Bajan Turbias known as "River of Blood" in English. He also composed the "Peronist March" (Marcha Peronista), which served as the anthem of the Peronist movement. Del Carril was himself a committed Peronist and was briefly blacklisted and sent into exile in Mexico following Peron's overthrow in 1955.

His 1961 film Esta tierra es mía was entered into the 2nd Moscow International Film Festival.

Filmography

Actor

El canto cuenta su historia (1976)
La malavida (1973)
Siempre fuimos compañeros (1973)
Amalio Reyes, un hombre (1970)
¡Viva la vida! (1969)
El día que me quieras (1969)
Buenas noches, Buenos Aires (1964)
La sentencia (1964)
La calesita (1963)
Esta tierra es mía (1961)
Amorina (1961)
Buenos días, Buenos Aires (corto - 1960)
Culpable (1960)
 The White Land (1959)
Más allá del olvido (1956)
El último perro (1956)
Vida nocturna (1955)
Las aguas bajan turbias (1952)
Surcos de sangre (1950)
El último payador (1950)
 A Story of the Nineties (1949)
 My Poor Beloved Mother (1948)
 Buenos Aires Sings (1947)
La cumparsita (1947)
 The Associate (1946)
 The Circus Cavalcade (1945)
Los dos rivales (1944)
La piel de zapa (1943)
Pasión imposible (1943)
Amor último modelo (1942)
 Story of a Poor Young Man (1942)
 When the Heart Sings (1941)
 By the Light of a Star (1941) 
 The Song of the Suburbs (1941)
Confesión (1940)
The Tango Star (1940)
Gente bien (1939)
 The Life of Carlos Gardel (1939)
La vida es un tango (1939)
 Honeysuckle (1938)
 Three Argentines in Paris (1938)
La vuelta de Rocha (1937)
 The Boys Didn't Wear Hair Gel Before (1937)

Director
Yo maté a Facundo (1975)
Buenas noches, Buenos Aires (1964)
La sentencia (1964)
La calesita (1963)
Esta tierra es mía (1961)
Amorina (1961)
Culpable (1960)
 The White Land (1959)
Una cita con la vida (1958)
Más allá del olvido (1956)
La Quintrala, doña Catalina de los Ríos y Lisperguer (1955)
Las aguas bajan turbias (1952)
Surcos de sangre (1950)
 A Story of the Nineties (1949)

Screenwriter
Yo maté a Facundo (1975)
Historia del 900 (1949)

Producer
Buenas noches, Buenos Aires (1964)
La sentencia (1964)
La calesita (1963)
Las tierras blancas (1959)
Una cita con la vida (1958)
Más allá del olvido (1956)
La Quintrala, doña Catalina de los Ríos y Lisperguer (1955)
Surcos de sangre (1950)
Historia del 900 (1949)

Bibliography
 Finkielman, Jorge. The Film Industry in Argentina: An Illustrated Cultural History. McFarland, 2003.
 Rist, Peter H. Historical Dictionary of South American Cinema. Rowman & Littlefield, 2014.

References

External links
 

1912 births
1989 deaths
People from Buenos Aires
Argentine people of Italian descent
Argentine male film actors
20th-century Argentine male actors
Argentine film directors
Argentine film producers
Tango singers
Male tango film actors
Tango film directors
20th-century Argentine male singers